Petrovický is a surname. Notable people with the surname include:

 Ronald Petrovický (born 1977), Slovak ice hockey player
 Róbert Petrovický (born 1973), Slovak ice hockey player